The Paula Poundstone Show is an American variety show that aired on Saturday night from October 30, 1993 to November 6, 1993. The premiere episode aired at 10:00 pm before moving to 9:00 pm for its second episode. The second episode finished 96th in the Nielsen ratings. The show was canceled after airing its second episode.

Premise
The show was a mix of topical comedy, music and audience participation.

Episodes

References

External links

1993 American television series debuts
1993 American television series endings
English-language television shows
American Broadcasting Company original programming
Television shows set in Los Angeles
Television series by Warner Bros. Television Studios